Thomas Andrew Simpson (born 7 November 1974) is an English cricketer. Simpson is a left-handed batsman. He was born in Hampstead, London and later educated at Eton College, where he captained first team cricket for two years running.

Simpson represented the Middlesex Cricket Board in a single List A match against Wiltshire in the 2000 NatWest Trophy. In his only List A match he scored 3 runs.

He currently plays club cricket for Brondesbury Cricket Club in the Middlesex County Cricket League.

References

External links
Tom Simpson at Cricinfo
Tom Simpson at CricketArchive

1974 births
Living people
People from Hampstead
Cricketers from Greater London
People educated at Eton College
English cricketers
Middlesex Cricket Board cricketers